Women, and children from Eastern Europe, West Africa, and Asia, as well as the Caribbean and Brazil, subjected to trafficking in persons,  forced prostitution and forced labor. U.S. State Department's Office to Monitor and Combat Trafficking in Persons placed the country in "Tier 1"  in 2017. Women and children, many from Africa, continued to be subjected to forced domestic servitude. Often their “employers” are diplomats who enjoy diplomatic immunity from prosecution, including those from Saudi Arabia. Reportedly men from North Africa are subjected to forced labor in the agricultural and construction sectors in southern France. The Government of France estimates that the majority of the 18,000 women in France's commercial sex trade are likely forced into prostitution. It also estimates a significant number of children in France are victims of forced prostitution, primarily from Romania, West Africa, and North Africa. Romani and other unaccompanied minors in France continued to be vulnerable to forced begging. There were reportedly six French women subjected to forced prostitution in Luxembourg in 2009.

Women and children from Brazil were subjected to forced labor and forced prostitution in the French overseas territory of French Guiana. There are also a number of young women in prostitution from Haiti, Suriname, and the Dominican Republic in French Guiana, some of whom may be vulnerable to trafficking. The French government investigated the existence of forced labor and forced prostitution occurring in gold mining sites in French Guiana in 2009, initiating 17 legal proceedings and arresting two trafficking offenders in French Guiana during the reporting period.

The Government of France fully complies with the minimum standards for the elimination of trafficking. The government continued to train prosecutors and judges to make better use of France's anti-trafficking law, continued to prosecute forced prostitution and forced labor offenders, and increased public-private partnerships to prevent trafficking. The government reported identifying a significant number of trafficking victims in 2009. While the government concluded that all identified victims were referred for care and assistance, it reported it did not officially collect or monitor this data in 2009.

Prosecution
France prohibits trafficking for sexual exploitation through Article 225 of its penal code, which prescribes penalties that are sufficiently stringent and commensurate with those prescribed for rape. In January 2009, the government amended its anti-trafficking law to include a specific definition of forced labor. The government reported convicting 19 trafficking offenders under its anti-trafficking statute in 2008, the most recent year for which data was available, compared with 33 convicted trafficking offenders in 2007. The government did not provide an average sentence for these 19 traffickers, but reported the maximum sentence was up to seven years imprisonment. In addition, the government reported convicting an additional 26 trafficking offenders for the forced prostitution of children, with sentences up to seven years. French officials continued to rely largely on anti-pimping provisions of the country's penal code to prosecute suspected sex trafficking offenses. The government reported 523 prosecutions under its anti-pimping statute in 2008; approximately 16 percent of the original arrests were for trafficking-specific offenses. The Government of France successfully dismantled 40 trafficking rings in France in 2009 and cooperated to dismantle 14 international networks with bilateral partners through joint investigation teams aimed at investigating and prosecuting cases across borders.

Protection
The national government and city of Paris continued to partner with NGOs in order to provide trafficking victims with a network of services and shelters during the reporting period. The government provided some indirect funding for victims’ care in 2009; however, it did not report overall funding allocations to NGOs for victims of trafficking. One NGO reported it received 20 percent of its budget from the government in 2009 but had to seek private funding in order to provide temporary housing for trafficking victims. Another NGO reported it worked with pro-bono medical and social service providers in order to assist victims of forced labor. A third NGO working with unaccompanied minors who are at risk of becoming victims of trafficking in France reported that it received 98 percent of its budget from the government in 2009. The government reported police and other authorities identified and referred 799 trafficking victims to NGOs for assistance in 2009; however, it reported that it did not officially collect or track data on the actual number or percentage of these identified victims that it referred for shelter and assistance. The NGO Committee Against Modern Slavery (CCEM) reported 216 cases of forced labor in France in 2008; 120 of these victims were reportedly placed in protective custody. The government increased its partnership with the Romanian government in order to improve the protection, return, and reintegration of Romani people unaccompanied minors. The French government provided witness protection services and issued one-year residency permits, which can be renewed every six months, to victims of trafficking who cooperated with authorities in the investigation and prosecution of traffickers; the government also provided identified victims with assistance and a 30-day reflection period to decide whether to cooperate with law enforcement. A trafficking victim may receive a permanent residency card though only if the defendant is successfully convicted by the government. The government did not report the number of victims that received residence permits or cards in 2009. One NGO continued to express frustration with the fees required for the residency permit and renewal of the permit. NGOs continued to provide monthly stipends to trafficking victims, with some of these stipends provided by the government. The government formally assists trafficking victims seeking return to their countries of origin, though fewer than five percent usually decide to do so. Although the border police reportedly used indicator cards to proactively identify victims, French border police do not have any systematic procedures in place to identify trafficking victims, according to a 2009 report by Human Rights Watch. Some local observers continued to criticize the government's lack of a proactive approach to identifying trafficking victims and reported that some women in prostitution are arrested and fined for solicitation without being screened to determine if they are trafficking victims. To address this deficiency, the government reported it continued to provide mandatory training to all law enforcement personnel to increase their identification and awareness of potential trafficking victims in 2009.

A 2009 Human Rights Watch Report cited the French government for alleged abusive police treatment and the forced removal of unaccompanied minors from Roissy Charles de Gaulle Airport. The report described French authorities’ policy of detaining unaccompanied minors, including potential trafficking victims, in a designated “transit zone” at the airport. French authorities failed to screen these children for indications of trafficking, treating them as irregular migrants, which resulted in their deportation and which could make them vulnerable to re-trafficking or persecution in their home countries. The report documented two cases in which the government failed to adequately identify two children from Nigeria and Guinea as trafficking victims, in one case the victim's trafficker visited her in detention to collect money. Reportedly, the French Red Cross regularly alerts French authorities about the need to improve the response to children who appear to be trafficking victims.

Prevention
The Government of France sustained strong prevention efforts in 2009 and led European efforts to prevent human trafficking on the Internet. Its multi-disciplinary group met throughout 2009 to improve national coordination and ensure a victim-centered approach. The government launched a national campaign in 2010 combating violence against women in all forms; the campaign highlighted trafficking in persons as part of this broader campaign. In January 2010, the government sponsored a nationwide conference that brought together law enforcement, magistrates, and NGOs to improve partnerships in order to better protect victims and prevent trafficking. The government, in partnership with the hotel industry, provided training for managers and employees of major hotel groups on identification techniques for potential victims of trafficking and how to report potential trafficking. As a law enforcement activity that could serve to prevent human trafficking, the government reported convicting 149 offenders for “crimes related to modern day slavery,” including 117 convictions for “subjecting vulnerable individuals to indecent accommodations and working conditions” and 32 convictions for “withholding wages of vulnerable individuals.” In October 2009, the government announced the creation of a public-private partnership to address child sports trafficking and committed $2.74 million towards the initiative. In 2009, ECPAT France launched a progressive public awareness campaign in cooperation with Air France, over which the government exercises considerable influence, to target French child sex tourists; the campaign stressed the legal consequences of such sexual exploitation crimes committed abroad and the government's commitment to prosecute these crimes in French courts, imposing strong prison sentences for convicted offenders. The government did not conduct or fund any demand-reduction awareness campaigns aimed at raising awareness among potential clients of victims in France. The government provided all French military and law enforcement personnel with general training on trafficking during their basic training. There was also a three-week general training given to French military personnel before their deployment abroad for international peacekeeping missions.

In March 2009, the government convicted two French nationals for aggravated sex tourism offenses they committed in Southeast Asia; both received the maximum sentences of seven years. In September 2009, French Police dismantled a makeshift camp for undocumented migrants near the port of Calais, known colloquially as “the jungle,” and rounded up almost 300 Afghans, Pakistanis, and others who had hoped to cross the English Channel into Great Britain. Although media reports indicated that French officials hailed the demolition as a prevention measure for trafficking, it is unclear as to whether the action was explicitly intended to be an anti-trafficking measure. Local observers and international experts criticized the government's response, citing it increased these migrants' vulnerability to trafficking.

See also
 Human trafficking
 Human rights in France

References

 
Human rights abuses in France